Cole Robert Waites (born June 10, 1998) is an American professional baseball pitcher for the San Francisco Giants of Major League Baseball (MLB). He played college baseball at the University of West Alabama, and was drafted by the Giants in the 18th round of the 2019 Major League Baseball draft. He made his MLB debut in 2022.

Amateur career
Waites attended Archer High School in Lawrenceville, Georgia. He played college baseball, primarily as a starter, at the University of West Alabama, where his 118 strikeouts as a junior led the Gulf South Conference. He was drafted by the San Francisco Giants in the 18th round of the 2019 Major League Baseball draft, and signed for a signing bonus of $100,000.

Professional career

2019-21
Waites made his professional debut in 2019 with the Arizona League Giants. He did not play for a team in 2020 due to the Minor League Baseball season being cancelled because of the COVID-19 pandemic. 

Waites returned in 2021 after missing most of the season recovering from knee surgery for torn meniscus to pitch for the Arizona Complex League Giants and San Jose Giants. In 2021 as a reliever he was a combined 2-0 with two saves and an 0.68 ERA, as in 13.1 innings he gave up one hit and struck out 31 batters. After the season, he pitched in the Arizona Fall League.

2022
Waites started 2022 with the Eugene Emeralds. He was then promoted to the Richmond Flying Squirrels and Sacramento River Cats, pitching out of the bullpen.

On September 12, 2022, the Giants selected Waites' contract and promoted him to the major leagues. 

Between the three minor league teams in 2022 he was 4-3 with a 1.94 ERA as in 41.2 innings he gave up 25 hits and had 76 strikeouts. In his minor league career through his 2022 call-up, in 71.1 innings he had a 45.1% strikeout rate (averaging 16.9 strikeouts per 9 innings) and 2.78 ERA, with a 13.8% walk rate.

In 2022 with the Giants he was 0-0 with a 3.18 ERA in seven relief appearances, in which he pitched 5.2 innings.

Pitching style
Waites relies primarily on a mid-90s fastball that has reached 100 mph, and an above-average slider.

References

External links

1998 births
Living people
People from Lawrenceville, Georgia
Baseball players from Georgia (U.S. state)
Major League Baseball pitchers
San Francisco Giants players
West Alabama Tigers baseball players
Arizona League Giants players
Arizona Complex League Giants players
San Jose Giants players
Eugene Emeralds players
Richmond Flying Squirrels players
Sacramento River Cats players
Scottsdale Scorpions players